Donja Slatina refers to:

In Bosnia and Herzegovina:
 Donja Slatina (Ribnik) a village in Ribnik municipality
 Donja Slatina (Šamac) a village in Šamac municipality

In Serbia:

 Donja Slatina (Leskovac), a village in Leskovac municipality